Dave Perry (born 21 May 1966) was co-commentator on the UK computer and video games television shows GamesMaster and Games World. Perry was most famous for walking off Gamesmaster.

He was responsible for launching many games magazines, including Games World, Play, PowerStation, X-Gen, STATION and Mega Power. He has since opened a tattoo parlour named Revolver Tattoo Rooms.

References

External links
GamesMaster the inside story 2016 at The Retro Hour
Interview and Feature at end of 2006 at NTSC-UK
2006 interview at Way of the Rodent
2003 interview at Jolt Online Gaming
Interview at UK Resistance
2007 Interview at Prankster101 Productions

1966 births
Living people
British tattoo artists
English television presenters
Place of birth missing (living people)